Coenobita purpureus, known generally as the Okinawan blueberry hermit crab or blueberry hermit crab, is a species of land hermit crab in the family Coenobitidae.

Distribution and habitat 
They typically inhabit and are endemic only along the mainland, oceanic, and continental island coasts of Japan. They are considered to have a very narrow distribution within this northwestern pacific region.

References

Further reading

External links

 

Decapods
Articles created by Qbugbot
Crustaceans described in 1858